Blake Gopnik (born 1963 in Philadelphia, Pennsylvania) is an American art critic who has lived in New York City since 2011. He previously spent a decade as chief art critic of The Washington Post, prior to which he was an arts editor and critic in Canada. He has a doctorate in art history from Oxford University, and has written on aesthetic topics ranging from Facebook to gastronomy.  He is the author of Warhol, a long biography of the American Pop artist Andy Warhol.

Personal life
Blake Gopnik was born in Philadelphia, in 1963, to Irwin and Myrna Gopnik with whom he moved to Montreal as a small child.  He and his five siblings – Berkeley psychologist Alison Gopnik, writer Adam Gopnik, ocean scientist Morgan Gopnik, archeologist Hilary Gopnik, and Melissa Gopnik, who manages a non-profit – grew up in Moshe Safdie's brutalist masterpiece Habitat 67.

Gopnik is married to the artist Lucy Hogg and has one son, Aaron Gopnik-Ramshaw, who is a private investigator in Toronto.

Education

Gopnik was educated in French at the Académie Michèle-Provost  and then trained and practiced as a commercial photographer.  He moved on to study at McGill University, where he received an honours B.A. in medieval studies, with a specialization in Vulgate and medieval Latin. In 1994, he completed a doctorate at the University of Oxford on realism in Renaissance painting and the philosophy of representation.

Career
After receiving his doctorate, Gopnik returned to Canada where he held minor academic jobs before switching to journalism. In 1995, he became the editor in chief of Insite, a Canadian magazine of architecture and design, before being hired as the fine-arts editor at The Globe and Mail. In 1998, he became the Globe's art critic. From 2000 to 2010, Gopnik worked at The Washington Post as chief art critic. He wrote more than 500 articles about art, ranging from China's terracotta warriors to Andy Warhol's late works. He also wrote pieces about design, food, fashion and beer. He was a pioneer in web video at the Washington Post and launched The Daily Pic, a picture-a-day blog.

In 2011, Gopnik was hired as the art and design critic at Newsweek magazine and its Daily Beast web site, where he wrote about Warhol, Damien Hirst and possible future scenarios for the global art market.  He was critic-at-large for Artnet News,  and writes on art and design for a wide range of publications. He is a regular contributor to The New York Times.

Gopnik contributes to the scholarly debate on neuroesthetics,  and has recently published a comprehensive biography of Andy Warhol with HarperCollins.

In 2014, Gopnik was named a 2015-2016 resident biography fellow at the Leon Levy Center for Biography at City University of New York. He was a recipient of a Cullman Fellowship at the New York Public Library for 2017–2018.

Bibliography

References

External links
Blake Gopnik website

1963 births
Living people
Writers from Philadelphia
American art critics
20th-century American Jews
The Washington Post people
Alumni of the University of Oxford
McGill University alumni
American writers
Jewish-American families
American emigrants to Canada
21st-century American Jews